Poecilarctia is a monotypic moth genus in the subfamily Arctiinae. Its only species, Poecilarctia venata, can be found in Zimbabwe and Malawi. Both the genus and species were first described by Per Olof Christopher Aurivillius in 1921.

References

Lepidoptera of Malawi
Lepidoptera of Zimbabwe
Moths of Sub-Saharan Africa
Monotypic moth genera
Spilosomina